Philophrosyne ( or ), also Jupiter LVIII and provisionally known as , is a natural satellite of Jupiter. It was discovered by a team of astronomers from the University of Hawaii led by Scott S. Sheppard, et al. in 2003,
but then lost. It was recovered in 2017 and given its permanent designation that year.

Characteristics
Philophrosyne is about 2 kilometres in diameter, and orbits Jupiter at an average distance of 22,721,000 km in 699.676 days, at an inclination of 142° to the ecliptic (142° to Jupiter's equator), in a retrograde direction and with an eccentricity of 0.0932.

It belongs to the Pasiphae group, retrograde irregular moons that orbit Jupiter between 22.8 and 24.1 Gm, at inclinations of roughly 150-155°.

Name
The moon was named in 2019 after Philophrosyne (Φιλοφροσύνη), the ancient Greek spirit of welcome, friendliness, and kindness, the daughter of Hephaestus and Aglaea and granddaughter of Zeus. The name originated from a naming contest held on Twitter where it is suggested by users including CHW3M Myth Experts (@Chw3mmyths) which is an 11th-grade history class studying Greek and Roman philosophy as of 2019, Victoria (@CharmedScribe), and Lunartic (@iamalunartic) who has concurrently helped in naming another Jovian moon Eupheme.

References

Pasiphae group
Moons of Jupiter
Irregular satellites
Discoveries by Scott S. Sheppard
Astronomical objects discovered in 2003
Moons with a retrograde orbit